Chondria is a genus of beetle in the family Endomychidae.

Species 
 Chondria affinis Arrow, 1943
 Chondria agilis Arrow, 1943
 Chondria apicalis Arrow, 1923
 Chondria araneola Arrow, 1925
 Chondria armipes Strohecker, 1978
 Chondria auritarsis Strohecker, 1978
 Chondria brevior Strohecker, 1978
 Chondria buruana Arrow, 1926
 Chondria cardiaca Strohecker, 1955
 Chondria elegans Strohecker, 1979

References

External links 

Endomychidae
Coccinelloidea genera